Communication and Information Technology Regulatory Authority  (CITRA) (it is an independent governmental entity in Kuwait

Established by a decision of the Council of Ministers Law No. 37 of 2014 regulating the establishment of the Communication and Information Technology Regulatory Authority.

Citra is responsible for overseeing the telecommunications sector, monitor and protect the interests of users and service providers and regulate the services of telecommunication networks in the country, while ensuring transparency, equality of opportunity and fair competition.

Tasks and Authorized Powers

 Protecting consumer affairs
 Regulating services, tariffs, and rates within the ICT sector.
 Encouraging competition and investment in the ICT sector and preventing unfair competition.
 Regulating and licensing telecommunications services.

ICT subsectors
  Telecommunications Sector
 Operators and Fair Competition Sector
 Information Technology (IT) Sector 
 Administrative and Financial Affairs Sector

References

External links
 
 Citra News

Government of Kuwait